North Little Rock City Hall is located at 300 Main Street in North Little Rock, Arkansas.  It is a Classical Revival two-story building, with an exterior of stone with terra cotta trim.  Prominent features of its street-facing facades (on Main and 3rd Streets) are massive engaged two-story fluted Ionic columns.  It was built in 1914–15, and is based on the design of a bank building seen by Mayor J.P. Faucette in St. Louis, Missouri.

The building was listed on the National Register of Historic Places in 1975. It is located in the city’s Argenta Historic District.

See also
National Register of Historic Places listings in Pulaski County, Arkansas

References

External links

City and town halls on the National Register of Historic Places in Arkansas
Neoclassical architecture in Arkansas
Buildings and structures completed in 1914
Buildings and structures in North Little Rock, Arkansas
City halls in Arkansas
National Register of Historic Places in Pulaski County, Arkansas